Moneyspire (formerly Fortora Fresh Finance) is personal finance software and small business accounting software developed by Moneyspire Inc. The software is available in two versions, one for Windows and another for macOS. The software tracks accounts, loans, bills, investments and budgets. Professional looking invoices can also be created and tracked in the Pro edition of Moneyspire. It imports data from QIF, OFX, QFX and CSV files. Moneyspire has the ability to use its financial data files interchangeably between the Mac and Windows versions of the software, thus making the software a viable choice for people who use both PCs and Macs. Moneyspire can also manage accounts from multiple currencies, and automatically track exchange rates and transfers between foreign accounts. Moneyspire also allows downloading of transactions directly from financial institutions via the Moneyspire Connect service.

See also
Comparison of accounting software

References

External links 
 Moneyspire Personal Finance & Small Business Accounting Software

Accounting software
Cross-platform software
Personal information manager software for Linux
Personal information manager software for macOS
Personal information manager software for Windows